Melvin Vissers (born 11 February 1996) is a Dutch footballer who plays as a midfielder.

Club career 
On 30 March 2012, Vissers signed a three-year contract with Ajax, tying him down to the club until 30 June 2015. He made his debut for Jong Ajax as a 61st-minute substitute for Davy Klaassen in an Eerste Divisie match against Achilles '29 on 8 September 2013. In the Summer of 2015, Vissers returned to Sparta Rotterdam having won the Dutch under-19 league title twice with Ajax A1, having made two appearances in the Eerste Divisie for the reserves team Jong Ajax as well.

Career statistics

Honours

Club
Ajax A1 (under-19)
 A-Junioren Eredivisie (2): 2013–14, 2014–15

Sparta Rotterdam
 Eerste Divisie: 2015-16

References

External links 
 

1996 births
Living people
Dutch footballers
Association football midfielders
Sparta Rotterdam players
AFC Ajax players
Jong Ajax players
Eerste Divisie players
Footballers from The Hague